Rafael Navarro Leal (born 14 April 2000) is a Brazilian footballer who plays for Palmeiras as a forward.

Career

Botafogo
Born in Cabo Frio, Rio de Janeiro state, Navarro played as a youth for Fluminense before moving to Atlético Goianiense, where he was an unused substitute in the 2019 Campeonato Brasileiro Série B. On 30 October 2019, he returned to his home state, signing for Botafogo on a two-year deal and being assigned to the under-20 team.

Navarro made his professional debut on 18 January 2020 in a 1–0 Campeonato Carioca loss away to Volta Redonda, as a 73rd-minute replacement for Lucas Campos; he made six more appearances over the season. His Série A debut came a year and a week later off the bench in a 2–0 loss at Fluminense, while his first goal was on 2 February 2021 to earn a 1–1 draw at Palmeiras. He scored again in a 5–2 loss at home to Grêmio, with his team already relegated.

In the 2021 Campeonato Brasileiro Série B, Navarro finished as third-highest scorer with 15 goals as his team won it. This included braces in wins over Náutico and Brusque towards the end of the season, both at the Estádio Olímpico Nilton Santos.

Palmeiras
On 22 December 2021, Palmeiras signed Navarro for the next five years. He played ten times in the victorious season in the Campeonato Paulista, but did not score. On 12 February 2022 he played the final 17 minutes of a 2–1 loss to Chelsea in the FIFA Club World Cup Final. In his first Copa Libertadores game for the two-times defending champions on 7 April, he came off the bench at half time to score twice in a 4–0 win at Venezuela's Deportivo Táchira; he followed it a week later with four goals in thirty minutes of an 8–1 rout of Bolivians Independiente Petrolero at the Allianz Parque.

Career statistics

Honours
Botafogo
 Campeonato Brasileiro Série B: 2021

Palmeiras
 Recopa Sudamericana: 2022
 Campeonato Paulista: 2022
Campeonato Brasileiro Série A: 2022
Supercopa do Brasil: 2023

References

2000 births
Living people
People from Cabo Frio
Brazilian footballers
Brazil youth international footballers
Association football forwards
Campeonato Brasileiro Série A players
Campeonato Brasileiro Série B players
Botafogo de Futebol e Regatas players
Sociedade Esportiva Palmeiras players
Sportspeople from Rio de Janeiro (state)